Kusheh Nama (also Romanized as Kūsheh Namā) is a village in Barkuh Rural District, Kuhsorkh County, Razavi Khorasan Province, Iran. At the 2006 census, its population was 378, in 112 families.

References 

Populated places in Kuhsorkh County